The women's team sprint event at the 2020 Summer Olympics took place on 2 August 2021 at the Izu Velodrome. 16 cyclists (8 teams of 2) from 8 nations competed.

Background

This was the 3rd appearance of the event, which has been held at every Summer Olympics since 2012. The reigning Olympic champions are Gong Jinjie and Zhong Tianshi of China. The reigning (2020) World Champions are Pauline Grabosch and Emma Hinze of Germany.

Russia, Germany, China, Great Britain, Australia, and the Netherlands are traditionally strong track cycling nations.

Qualification

A National Olympic Committee (NOC) could enter up to 1 team of 2 cyclists in the women's team sprint. Quota places are allocated to the NOC, which selects the cyclists. Qualification is entirely through the 2018–20 UCI nation rankings. The eight top NOCs on the ranking list qualified for the team sprint event. These nations also received the right to enter two cyclists each in the individual sprint and Keirin. Because qualification was complete by the end of the 2020 UCI Track Cycling World Championships on 1 March 2020 (the last event that contributed to the 2018–20 rankings), qualification was unaffected by the COVID-19 pandemic.

Competition format

The women's team sprint is competed over two-laps (500 m), with two riders for each nation. Each member of the team must lead for one of the laps. The time for a team is measured to when the first cyclist finishes. Ties are broken by splits on the last lap.

The tournament consists of an initial qualifying round that seeds the teams. The first round comprises races between two teams of two cyclists, starting on opposite sides of the track. The races are based on seeding (1st vs. 8th, 2nd vs. 7th, etc.). The winners of those four heats advance to the medal round, with the two fastest winners competing in the gold medal final and the two slower winners facing off for bronze.

Schedule
All times are Japan Standard Time (UTC+9)

Results

Qualifying

First round

Finals

Podium controversy
The IOC had asked China to explain the presence of Mao badges on Chinese athletes' uniforms, in particular during the medal ceremony for the women's team sprint.

References

Women's team sprint
Cycling at the Summer Olympics – Women's team sprint
Women's events at the 2020 Summer Olympics